The 1929–30 Prima Divisione was the third level league of the 30th Italian football championship.

In 1928, FIGC had decided a reform of the league structure of Italian football. The top-level league was the National Division, composed by the two divisions of Serie A and Serie B. Under them, there were the local championship, the major one being the First Division, that in 1935 will take the name of Serie C. The winners of the four groups of First Division would be promoted to Serie B, whereas the scheduled relegations were annulled by the Federation which expanded the division.

Teams 
Club selection was different between the two parts of the country. The North admitted 37 out of the 43 clubs of the previous year, solely without promoted and disbanded teams, and 7 promoted club from the Second Division plus Pro Lissone as last-minute team. The South chose 14 best clubs from the five regions of the special Southern Championship, plus Foligno as guest.

Regulation 
Four groups of 15 teams, thirty matchdays. Group winners were promoted, ultimate and penultimate clubs should be relegated. A national title was assigned.

Northern division

Girone A
Final classification

Lucchese was promoted to 1930–31 Serie B.
Final table was compiled by Direttorio Divisioni Superiori (D.D.S.) just by points and published by the sports newspaper Il Littoriale on Saturday June 14 page 6 in report no. 40 dated June 11 just indicating: Corniglianese and Astigiani retired.

Results

Girone B
Final classification

Results

Girone C
Final classification

Results

Southern division
Final classification

Results

National final

Udinese is crowned national champion of Prima Divisione.

Footnotes

1929-1930
3
Italy